The discography of Icona Pop, a Swedish DJ duo, consists of two studio albums, four extended plays and five singles. The press, including NME, The Guardian, Rolling Stone and Pitchfork, have praised the duo. The Guardian described the debut single "Manners" as "effortlessly cool".

In autumn 2012, the duo released an extended play Iconic in the US and the album Icona Pop in Sweden. The duo have performed in Sweden, the US, Germany, Italy, and London and have also been interviewed by Swedish and foreign press. "I Love It", a pre-release of their self-titled album Icona Pop charted on Sverigetopplistan, the official Swedish singles chart.

On 20 September 2013, Icona Pop released their second studio album, a revised edition of Icona Pop, This Is... Icona Pop.

Studio albums

Extended plays

Singles

As lead artist

As featured artist

Promotional singles

Other appearances

Music videos

Notes

References

Discographies of Swedish artists